Delnor-Wiggins Pass State Park is a Florida state park located on a barrier island on Florida's southwest coast near Naples, Florida, 6 miles west of I-75 in North Naples. The Cocohatchee River and the Gulf of Mexico are accessible from the park, which contains a hard-bottom reef.

History 
The early record of this area begins in the late 1800s with Joe Wiggins, for whom the park is named. He ran a trading post where he traded goods with Seminole Indians and settlers. Decades later, in 1964, Collier County acquired the land through the help of Lester J. and Dellora A. Norris. This is where the name Delnor comes from; the first three letters of Dellora and the first three letters of Norris. In 1970, the state of Florida purchased the land from Collier County for a state park, which opened in 1976.

Fauna
Among the wildlife of the park are bald eagles, ospreys, owls, loggerhead sea turtles, West Indian manatees, and migratory shorebirds. The endangered gopher tortoise can also be found there. It is the only tortoise found east of the Mississippi River.

Recreational activities
Activities include fishing, sunbathing, swimming, paddleboarding, boating, geocaching, hiking, and nature viewing. Visitors can also scuba dive, snorkel, kayak,  and picnic. A fishing license is required to fish at the park in some areas. Weddings can also be held there.

Amenities 
Amenities include beaches, boat ramps, boardwalks, observation decks, picnic areas, and a pavilion that has 10 tables and several grills, and can hold 100 people. Also, a concession stand is present.

Hours and fees
Florida state parks are open between dawn and sundown every day of the year (including holidays). Admission is $6 per vehicle, and $5 to use the boat ramp, in addition to the admission fee.

References

External links

 Delnor-Wiggins Pass State Park at Florida State Parks
 Delnor-Wiggins Pass State Recreation Area at Absolutely Florida
Delnor-Wiggins Pass State Recreation Area at Wildernet

State parks of Florida
Parks in Collier County, Florida
Beaches of Florida
Protected areas established in 1981
Beaches of Collier County, Florida